Gyrophyllum is a genus of corals belonging to the family Pennatulidae.

The species of this genus are found in Central Atlantic Ocean, Malesia, Australia.

Species:

Gyrophyllum hirondellei 
Gyrophyllum sibogae

References

Pennatulidae
Octocorallia genera